The following television stations operate on virtual channel 26 in the United States:

 K05MX-D in Nephi, Utah
 K07XL-D in Mountain Home, Arkansas
 K08LI-D in White Sulphur Spring, Montana
 K20NH-D in Brainerd, Minnesota
 K22NR-D in Stephenville, Texas
 K24NO-D in Bonners Ferry, Idaho
 K26CV-D in Ogallala, Nebraska
 K26DD-D in Kalispell, Montana
 K26FT-D in Santa Barbara, California
 K26GS-D in Harrison, Arkansas
 K26GV-D in Omak, Washington
 K26GY-D in Breckenridge, Colorado
 K26KC-D in Dallas, Texas
 K26KF-D in Duluth, Minnesota
 K26LQ-D in White Sulphur Spring, Montana
 K26PF-D in Saint Cloud, Minnesota
 K26PP-D in Santa Maria-Lompoc, California
 K26PR-D in Needles, California
 K30LS-D in Sandpoint, Idaho
 K31GP-D in Brookings, etc., Oregon
 K32LQ-D in Yreka, California
 K34NO-D in Grants Pass, Oregon
 K34NP-D in Red Lake, Minnesota
 K36PW-D in Priest Lake, Idaho
 KAAH-TV in Honolulu, Hawaii
 KAGW-CD in Wichita, Kansas
 KCDT in Coeur D'Alene, Idaho
 KCVB-CD in Logan, Utah
 KDRC-LD in Redding, California
 KFTC in Bemidji, Minnesota
 KFWY-LD in Cheyenne, Wyoming
 KGCW in Burlington, Iowa
 KGNG-LD in Las Vegas, Nevada
 KHDT-LD in Denver, Colorado
 KINT-TV in El Paso, Texas
 KMPH-TV in Visalia, California
 KMVU-DT in Medford, Oregon
 KNDB in Bismarck, North Dakota
 KNPN-LD in Saint Joseph, Missouri
 KODF-LD in Dallas, Texas
 KOZJ in Joplin, Missouri
 KPMF-LD in Paragould, Arkansas
 KPXL-TV in Uvalde, Texas
 KRIV in Houston, Texas
 KTKB-LD in Tamuning, Guam
 KTKV-LD in Twin Falls, Idaho
 KTSF in San Francisco, California
 KUCL-LD in Salt Lake City, Utah
 KULC-LD in Port Arthur, Texas
 KVHD-LD in Los Angeles, California
 KVSD-LD in San Diego, California
 KVTH-DT in Hot Springs, Arkansas
 KXNV-LD in Incline Village, Nevada
 KYNE-TV in Omaha, Nebraska
 KZBZ-CD in Clovis, New Mexico
 W15EF-D in Sparta, North Carolina
 W18DS-D in Chattanooga, Tennessee
 W26BB-D in Vicksburg, Mississippi
 W26DC-D in Roslyn, New York
 W26DH-D in Auburn, Indiana
 W26EP-D in Potsdam, New York
 W26EW-D in Huntington, West Virginia
 W26FG-D in Eau Claire, Wisconsin
 W27EK-D in Boone, North Carolina
 W30CS-D in Zionville, North Carolina
 WAGT-CD in Augusta, Georgia
 WAIQ in Montgomery, Alabama
 WBUD-LD in Atlanta, Georgia
 WCEA-LD in Boston, Massachusetts
 WCIU-TV in Chicago, Illinois
 WDID-LD in Savannah, Georgia
 WDRJ-LD in Albany, Georgia
 WETA-TV in Washington, D.C.
 WGBA-TV in Green Bay, Wisconsin
 WGNO in New Orleans, Louisiana
 WGVT-LD in Gainesville, Florida
 WHPX-TV in New London, Connecticut
 WIVD-LD in Newcomerstown, Ohio
 WMEA-TV in Biddeford, Maine
 WMNN-LD in Lake City, Michigan
 WMVH-CD in Charleroi, Pennsylvania
 WNHO-LD in Defiance, Ohio
 WNTU-LD in Nashville, Tennessee
 WNYB in Jamestown, New York
 WOTF-TV in Daytona Beach, Florida
 WQTO in Ponce, Puerto Rico
 WRDP-LD in Columbus, Georgia
 WROB-LD in Topeka, Kansas
 WSFX-TV in Wilmington, North Carolina
 WTGC-LD in New Bern, North Carolina
 WTNC-LD in Durham, North Carolina
 WUEK-LD in Canton, Ohio
 WUNL-TV in Winston-Salem, North Carolina
 WUWT-CD in Union City, Tennessee
 WXAX-CD in Clearwater, Florida
 WYCU-LD in Charlestown, etc., New Hampshire
 WYXN-LD in New York, New York
 WZEO-LD in La Crosse, Wisconsin
 WZVN-TV in Naples, Florida

The following stations, which are no longer licensed, formerly operated on virtual channel 26:
 KGKY-LD in Joplin, Missouri
 KJYY-LD in Portland, Oregon
 W26DS-D in La Grange, Georgia
 WAGT in Augusta, Georgia
 WDRL-LD in Wilmington, North Carolina
 WEDD-LD in Roanoke, Virginia
 WEYB-LD in Montgomery, Alabama
 WTBS-LD in Atlanta, Georgia

References

26 virtual